Göta kanal 3: Kanalkungens hemlighet (English: Göta Canal 3: The Canal King's Secret) is a Swedish comedy film which was released to cinemas in Sweden on 25 December 2009 directed by Christjan Wegner.

It is a sequel to Göta kanal eller Vem drog ur proppen? and Göta kanal 2 – Kanalkampen.

Cast 
 Janne Carlsson as Janne Andersson
 Eva Röse as Petra Andersson
 Magnus Samuelsson as the motorcyclist
 Magnus Härenstam as Peter Black
 Sara Sommerfeld as Tanja Svensson
 Svante Grundberg as the canoeist
 Christian Rinmad as Vincent
 Rafael Edholm as Benito
 Eric Ericson as Henrik
 Jon Skolmen as a Norwegian

References

External links 
 
 

2009 films
2000s Swedish-language films
2009 comedy films
Boat racing films
Swedish comedy films
Swedish sequel films
2000s Swedish films